Adina Izarra (born 1959) is a Venezuelan musician, music educator and composer.

Biography
Adina Izarra was born in Caracas, Venezuela. She studied music under  Alfredo del Mónaco in Caracas and received her Ph.D. in composition from York University, England, in 1988, after studying with Vic Hoyland.

After 1988 Izarra returned to Caracas where she took a position as professor of composition at Simón Bolívar University. Between 1999 and 2001, she was a member of the executive committee of the International Society for Contemporary Music (ISCM).
Currently residing in Guayaquil, Ecuador, where she is a professor at the University of the Arts. She works in the areas of live electronics and audio-reactive visuals.

She has a duet with Rubén Riera, who plays ancient and contemporary plucked string instruments, with whom she performs original improvisations, works by both, as well as covers a lot of old music, transformed through electronics.

Adina has just received a Master's degree in Digital Audiovisual Postproduction from ESPOL, Guayaquil and has a PhD in composition from the University of York, England.Currently residing in Guayaquil, Ecuador, working as a professor at the University of the Arts. She works in the areas of live electronics and audio-reactive visuals.

Works
10 ° 29 'N. Acousmatic, 2007
All my life I loved hos, video, 2006
Vihuela for Vihuela, electronic collaboration with Rubén Riera, 2005
Third Aria for Oboe, Clarinet and Bassoon, 2004
3c Aria for flute, bassoon and guitar, 2004
The Earth is our home, for string quartet, 2004
In Visée, MP3 to Theorbo and Laptop, 2004 videos
Caucus, for piano solo, 2003
Two Medieval Miniatures, for clarinet in Bb and piano, 2003, short for guitar and string quartet, 2003
Folias of Spain, for harp alone, 2002
Guacaipuro, 2000. Opera for old instruments, chamber orchestra, chorus and soloists.
Three Short version for piano and flute, 2001
A Two MP3 Flute and Guitar. 1991
Two Movements for Quintet. 1991 Guitar and String Quartet National Award 1990
Guitar Concerto, 1991 Guitar and Chamber Orchestra
Tribute, 1991 Chamber Orchestra National Award, 1991
Luvina, 1992 Bass Flute and Delay
The Grinder, Flute Alone 1992
Incidental music for Euripides' TROJAN, 1993 Municipal Theatre Award 1994
Reeds, Single Flute 1994 Edited by Funves Caracas 1996, Analysis of the work by A. Izarra (1996)
Folias of Spain, Guitar Sola 1995 Commission Mavesa SA, Caracas
Landini cadence Study, 1996 Piano Solo
Profane Oratorio, 1997 Sop, barite., Flute, Harp, Guitar and percussion. Custom USB, Caracas
Portraits of Macondo, 1997 Clarinet, Bassoon and Piano Commissioned by Trio Neos (Mexico)
Concert Harp, 1997 Harp and Chamber Orchestra Commissioned Caracas Telda
Three short films: 1st short, short slow, the 2nd short 1998 Flute & Guitar
Oshunmare, 1982 Concerto for Violin and Orchestra Commissioned by University of York, England
Watch, 1983 Two pianists and narrator National Composition Prize 1984
Arpilleras Weaver Magic Orchestra, 1985 National Award 1985
Plumismo Flute, Piccolo 1986 Published by Equinox single, USB, Caracas
Sulphuratus Pitangus 1987 Concerto for Flute and Strings
Vojm 1988 Voice and Electronic Equipment
Through some Transparencies Alone 1989 Harp
1989 Margarita Soprano, Guitar and Flute
1989 Margarita Mezzo, Flute, Harp, Oboe, Keyboards and Bass.
Silences, 1989 Single Guitar Edited by Funves Caracas 1990
Reverón, 1989 Flute, Oboe and Bass
, 1989 Two piccolos or Piccolo and Oboe
From a window with Parrots, Guitar Sola 1989

References

1959 births
Living people
20th-century classical composers
21st-century classical composers
Venezuelan classical composers
Venezuelan music educators
Venezuelan women classical composers
Musicians from Caracas
Academic staff of Simón Bolívar University (Venezuela)
Women in classical music
Women in electronic music
Venezuelan electronic musicians
Women music educators
20th-century women composers
21st-century women composers
Venezuelan women educators